A moorkop is a pastry consisting of a profiterole (cream puff) filled with whipped cream. The top of the profiterole is glazed with white or dark chocolate. Often there is whipped cream on the top, with a slice of tangerine or a piece of pineapple.

See also
 List of choux pastry dishes
 List of pastries

External links 

Dutch pastries
German pastries
Culture of North Brabant
's-Hertogenbosch
Choux pastry